CFR Title 50 - Wildlife and Fisheries is one of fifty titles comprising the United States Code of Federal Regulations (CFR). Title 50 is the principal set of rules and regulations  issued by federal agencies of the United States regarding wildlife and fisheries. Maintained by the Office of the Federal Register, it is available in digital and printed form, and can be referenced online the Electronic Code of Federal Regulations (e-CFR).

Structure

The table of contents, as reflected in the e-CFR updated February 7, 2014, is as follows:

History
The CFR was authorized by President Franklin D. Roosevelt on October 11, 1938, as a means to organize and maintain the growing material published by federal agencies in the newly mandated Federal Register. The first volume of the CFR was published in 1939 with general applicability and legal effect in force June 1, 1938.

The Office of the Federal Register (OFR) began publishing yearly revisions for some titles in 1963 with legal effective dates of January 1 each year. By 1967 all 50 titles were updated annually and effective January 1.

The CFR was placed online in 1996. The OFR began updating the entire CFR online on a daily basis in 2001.

References

 50
United States Fish and Wildlife Service